The 30th Genie Awards were presented on April 12, 2010 to honour films released in 2009. Nominations were announced on March 1, 2010.

Controversy
Despite having won three awards at the 2009 Cannes Film Festival and having been selected as Canada's submission for Best Foreign Language film at the 82nd Academy Awards, Xavier Dolan's film I Killed My Mother (J'ai tué ma mère) was virtually absent from the ceremony, winning the Claude Jutra Award for best film by a first-time director but garnering no other nominations in any category at all. Both Kevin Tierney, vice-chairman of cinema for the Academy of Canadian Cinema and Television, and Martha Burns, the winner of the Genie Award for Best Supporting Actress, openly criticized the shutout, with Tierney likening it to "being sent to the kiddie table".

Awards

References

External links 
30th Genie Awards

Genie Awards
Genie Awards
Genie Awards